Braşoveanu is a Romanian surname. Notable people with the surname include:

Dumitru Braşoveanu, Moldovan politician

Romanian-language surnames